Topalov is a Bulgarian masculine surname, its feminine counterpart is Topalova. It may refer to
Desislava Topalova (born 1978), Bulgarian tennis player
Dmytro Topalov (born 1998), Ukrainian football player
Silvia Topalova
Veselin Topalov (born 1975), Bulgarian chess grandmaster
Vlad Topalov (born 1985), Russian singer, dancer and actor

Bulgarian-language surnames